The is the list of equipment of the Singapore Army, the land service branch of the Singapore Armed Forces (SAF). It is subdivided into infantry weapons, vehicles, unmanned aerial vehicle (UAVs), and radars.

Ground vehicles

Infantry weapons

Radars

Attire

Retired equipment
 AMX-13 SM1
 Light Strike Vehicle Mk.I 
 Soltam M-68 towed 155mm Howitzer
 Soltam M-71 towed 155mm Howitzer
 M114 155mm Howitzer
 AMX-10P 25 / PAC-90
 M40 recoilless rifle
 M2 Browning Heavy Machine Gun
 L1A1 Self-Loading Rifle
 Soltam M66 160mm Mortar

See also
 List of equipment of the Republic of Singapore Navy
 List of equipment of the Republic of Singapore Air Force

References

Singapore Army
Singaporean Army
Equipment